The pessimism controversy or pessimism dispute is a largely forgotten intellectual controversy that occurred in Germany, starting in the 1860s and ending around the beginning of the First World War. Philosophers who took part included Friedrich Nietzsche, Eugen Dühring, Eduard von Hartmann, neo-Kantians, Agnes Taubert, Olga Plümacher and critics of Hartmann. The controversy first arose as a response to Arthur Schopenhauer's growing posthumous public recognition in the 1860s. This led to the publication of a wide array of criticisms, attacking his pessimism. The publication of von Hartmann's Philosophy of the Unconscious, in 1869, which reaffirmed and further developed Schopenhauer's doctrine, reinvigorated the controversy. Hartmann published a great number of articles and four books in response to his critics, throughout the 1870s and 1880s. Agnes Taubert (Von Hartmann's wife) published Pessimism and Its Opponents, in 1873, in response to criticism of her husband, which had a strong influence on the controversy. The German-American philosopher Amalie J. Hathaway has been described as an unrecognised contributor to the controversy.

See also 

 Post-Schopenhauerian pessimism

References 

Controversies in Germany
Cultural history of Germany
German Empire
Philosophical pessimism

Philosophy controversies